Minnesota State Highway 67 (MN 67) is a  highway in southwest Minnesota, which runs from its intersection with U.S. Highway 75 in Oshkosh Township near Canby and continues east and southeast to its eastern terminus at its intersection with State Highway 68 in Morgan.

Route description
Highway 67 serves as an east–west and north–south route in southwest Minnesota between Canby, Clarkfield, Granite Falls, Redwood Falls, and Morgan.

The highway is officially marked as an east–west route by its highway shields from beginning to end.

History

Highway 67 was authorized in 1920 from present-day Highway 19 south of Echo to Granite Falls. In 1934, it was extended westward to U.S. 75 at Canby. The route was expanded east to Redwood Falls and southeast to Morgan .

Highway 67 was paved from Granite Falls to U.S. Highway 75 by 1940.  The route was completely paved by 1953.

In April 2019, the Minnesota Department of Transportation (MN-DOT) closed Highway 67 in both directions approximately 8 miles southeast of the intersection of 67 and State Highway 23 in Granite Falls.  The closure was necessary due to unstable ground deep underneath the roadbed, causing large cracks to appear in the road surface and rendering it impassable for traffic.  A detour is in place, following (from southeast to northwest) Yellow Medicine County Road 2 and State Highway 274 between Echo and Granite Falls.  MN-DOT permanently rerouted Highway 67 along this detour and closed off the failed section on September 27, 2022.  The main entrance to Upper Sioux Agency State Park is still accessible on the old roadway (which was redesignated as Minnesota State Highway 167) traveling southeast from Granite Falls.

Major intersections

References

067
Transportation in Yellow Medicine County, Minnesota
Transportation in Redwood County, Minnesota